Gökhan Emreciksin (born 10 September 1984) is a Turkish professional footballer who plays as a winger for an amateur side Bismil 1936 Gençlik.

Career 
Emreciksin transferred from Turkish Super League side Ankaragücü, in which he scored seven goals in 39 appearances, and moved to Fenerbahçe on January 3, 2009, signing a four-and-a-half-year contract. He was signed together with Abdülkadir Kayalı, also transferred from Ankaragücü. He previously played for Turkish teams Boluspor and Bandırmaspor before moving on to Ankaragücü. He was brought up through the youth ranks of Istanbul Sinopspor also spending about two years in the Galatasaray youth team. Emreciksin was handed the number 20 shirt, which was last held by former Fenerbahçe captain Alex, who now is with Brazilian team Coritiba, he was sent to Kayserispor in exchange for Mehmet Topuz and €9 million.

International 
His first and currently only call up to the Turkish national football team was on 26 March 2008 which was a friendly against the Belarus national football team.

References

External links
 
 

1984 births
Footballers from Istanbul
Living people
Turkish footballers
Association football midfielders
Bandırmaspor footballers
Boluspor footballers
MKE Ankaragücü footballers
Fenerbahçe S.K. footballers
Kayserispor footballers
Manisaspor footballers
Konyaspor footballers
Elazığspor footballers
Göztepe S.K. footballers
Kartalspor footballers
Tarsus Idman Yurdu footballers
Kütahyaspor footballers
İzmirspor footballers
Süper Lig players
TFF First League players
TFF Second League players
TFF Third League players